Nothing to Lose or Nothin' to Lose may refer to:

Film and television
Nothing to Lose (1995 film), or Ten Benny, an American film directed by Eric Bross 
Nothing to Lose (1997 film), an American comedy directed by Steve Oedekerk
Nothing to Lose (2002 film), a Thai crime film directed by Danny Pang
Nothing to Lose (TV series) or Judge vs. Judge, a 2017–2018 South Korean series
"Nothing to Lose" (CSI: Miami), a television episode

Literature
Nothing to Lose (novel), a 2008 Jack Reacher novel by Lee Child
Nothing to Lose, a 2004 young-adult novel by Alex Flinn
Nothing to Lose, a 2007 young-adult novel by Norah McClintock

Music

Albums 
 Nothing to Lose (Daniel Schuhmacher album), 2010
 Nothing to Lose (Eddie Money album), 1988
 Nothing to Lose (Emblem3 album) or the title song, 2013
 Nothing to Lose (Forty Deuce album) or the title song, 2005
 Nothing to Lose (Michael Learns to Rock album) or the title song, 1997
 Nothing to Lose (Sanctus Real album) or the title song, 2001
 Nothing to Lose (soundtrack) or the Naughty by Nature title song, "Nothin' to Lose", from the 1997 film
 Nothing to Lose, by Carpathian, 2006
 Nothing to Lose, by Rebecca, 1984

Songs
"Nothing to Lose" (Billy Talent song), 2004
"Nothing to Lose" (Bret Michaels song), 2010
"Nothing to Lose" (Operator song), 2008
"Nothing to Lose" (Vassy song), 2016
"Nothin' to Lose" (Marcel song), 2002; also recorded by Josh Gracin in 2004
"Nothin' to Lose" (Kiss song), 1974
"Nothin' to Lose", by Arcade from Arcade, 1993
"Nothing to Lose", by 2Pac from R U Still Down? (Remember Me), 1997
"Nothing to Lose", by Dragon from Dreams of Ordinary Men, 1986
"Nothing to Lose", by Jackson Yee, 2017
"Nothing to Lose", by Kylie Minogue from Enjoy Yourself, 1989
"Nothing to Lose", by S'Express from Intercourse, 1991

See also
Nothing Left to Lose (disambiguation)